Ada Elizabeth Levett (1881–1932), known professionally as A. E. Levett, was an Oxford-educated native of Bodiam, Sussex, who became a pioneering woman economic historian specialising in medieval feudalism. Levett was Vice Principal of St Hilda's College, Oxford, and later took up an appointment to a history chair at Westfield College at the University of London.

Biography
Levett was born into an old Sussex family in Bodiam, near the border between Kent and Sussex, where her family had lived since medieval times.  The once-powerful Anglo-Norman family, one of the county's oldest, had held manors and lands across Sussex. The study of medieval feudalism was probably in Levett's genes.

Levett's father was a simple yeoman farmer as well as an outdoor enthusiast. Academic pursuits were not encouraged in the household, especially for women. Nevertheless, both Elizabeth and her younger sister Mary Jane Levett (known professionally as M. J. Levett) became noted scholars.

Elizabeth Levett graduated from Oxford, then became Tutor in Modern History, writer, lecturer and Vice Principal at St Hilda's College, Oxford, where her scrupulous research and lean writing style made her stand out, even among her women contemporaries at Oxford, who often chose the route of close archival study to set themselves apart from male contemporaries. These women were redefining the role of women at the University: women had been forbidden to be faculty members or examine for the university, nor were they allowed to take the M.A. diploma (they were permitted to take a B.A.). Oxford published women's examination results in a separate class-list up until 1952.

But some Oxford dons welcomed the new influence. Professor Ernest Barker, for instance, taught both Elizabeth Levett and her gifted contemporary Maude Clarke before departing Oxford to become principal of King's College, London.

In her speciality of medieval economic history, Levett made use of archives in monasteries and local archives. Her style was known for its rigorous scholarship with attention to the minutest detail. In the Ewart lecture of 1916, Levett argued for "a stricter method, more rigidly exact in its collection of evidence." Her method, evident in her deeply researched works, was typical of her Oxford contemporaries, Levett noted. No detail should be left out, she said, "not even a mouse-trap, nor even, what is less, a peg for a harp."

Her most noted works are Studies in Manorial History and English Manorial History in the Fourteenth Century, but she published scores of academic articles and monographs on medieval history—from the obscure details of feudalism to more sensational topics like the Black Death.

A student of the legal and social historian Sir Paul Vinogradoff at Oxford, Elizabeth Levett took up the methods of careful scrutiny of archival sources, and added an economic historian's insights. Her study on the Black Death was groundbreaking at the time, and her work on the manorial courts of St Albans was seminal in the field. (She died before publication of the St. Albans work.) Speaking of her former professor Vinogradoff, Levett said "he taught me to unify my varied interests... into the great framework of Economics and Jurisprudence, and to bring it to bear on practical social history."

This growing wellspring of women historians was especially evident in the Victoria History of the Counties of England, where much of the text was written by female medievalists like Levett, poring over contemporaneous medieval records of peasantry at the time. It was an approach that Levett herself advocated and embraced, and historians saw its impact on her own work.

In writing about the property rights of peasant women during medieval times, for instance, Levett described the sale of land completed while a distraught wife sobbed in court—described in the Latin of medieval records as lacrimentem in pleno halimoto. The transfer was later voided by the court after the husband's death because of the wife's protests, but it was accepted by the court at the time. By focusing on such particular incidents in the old records, Levett limned the societal rights (or lack of them) of medieval women, who were seen as subordinate tenants.

In addition to her carefully footnoted academic pieces, Levett delivered lectures and wrote articles on prostitution, on university women and religion, and on women in the postwar world. As her reputation grew, and strictures on women in academia loosened, Levett found that she was in great demand as a lecturer and writer. The award of a history chair at Westfield College crowned her career as one of a small number of emerging British women historians.

Elizabeth Levett died in 1932 at the age of 51 at the height of her professional career.

Levett's younger sister F. M. Jane Levett, early professor of logic at Glasgow University, also went on to an illustrious career. She is best known for her translation (as M.J. Levett) of Plato's Theaetetus. Jane Levett died at her cottage near Tenterden, Kent, not far from her Bodiam birthplace, in 1974.

Works
 Europe Since Napoleon, London: Blackie, 1914. With introductory note by Richard Lodge.
 (with Adolphus Ballard) The Black Death, Oxford: Clarendon Press, 1916. Oxford studies in social and legal history, vol. 5. With a chapter contributed by Reginald Vivian Lennard.
 The black deaths on the estates of the see of Winchester. Oxford: Clarendon Press, 1916. Oxford studies in social and legal history, vol. 23. With a chapter contributed by Adolphus Ballard.
 'The Courts and Court Rolls of St. Albans Abbey', Transactions of the Royal Historical Society, 1924.
 English Economic History, London: E. Benn, 1929. Benn's sixpenny library, no. 48.
 The Consumer in History, London: E. Benn Limited, 1929. Self and society, no. 21.
 Studies in Manorial History, Oxford: Clarendon Press, 1938

References

External links
 
 Studies in Manorial History, Ada Elizabeth Levett, edited by H. M. Cam, M. Coate, L. S. Sutherland, socserv.mcmaster.ca

1881 births
1932 deaths
A.E.
Fellows of the Royal Historical Society
First women admitted to degrees at Oxford
Alumni of St Hilda's College, Oxford
People from Bodiam
British medievalists
Academics of the University of London
Fellows of St Hilda's College, Oxford
Economic historians
20th-century British historians
20th-century English women writers
20th-century English writers
British women historians